The Australian Top 100 Singles Chart is a chart that ranks the best-performing singles in Australia. Published by the ARIA report, the data is compiled by the Australian Recording Industry Association (ARIA) based collectively on each single's weekly physical sales. digital sales and airplay.

Chart history

Notes
Songs that peaked at number 2 include "All I Have" by Jennifer Lopez feat. LL Cool J, "Stole" by Kelly Rowland, "Angel" by Amanda Perez, "'03 Bonnie & Clyde" by Jay-Z and Beyoncé,
Songs that peaked at number 3 include "Nu Flow" by Big Brovaz, "Big Yellow Taxi" by  Counting Crows feat. Vanessa Carlton, "Shake Ya Tailfeather" by and P. Diddy feat. Nelly and Murphy Lee .
Other hit songs included "Hey Sexy Lady" by Shaggy, "Someday" by Nickelback and "Bump, Bump, Bump" by B2K feat. P. Diddy all of which peaked at number 4 and were all in the top 25.
Number of number-one singles: 19
Longest run at number-one: "Lose Yourself" by Eminem (8 weeks + 4 weeks in 2002)
Artist with the most number ones: 4, Delta Goodrem

References
Australian Record Industry Association (ARIA) official site
OzNet Music Chart

2003 in Australian music
Australia singles
2003